David Dunn (born 1979) is an English footballer.

David Dunn may also refer to:
Dave Dunn (born 1948), Canadian ice hockey player
Dave Dunn (American football) (born 1965), American football coach
David Dunn (footballer, born 1981), Scottish footballer 
David Dunn (American football) (born 1972), former American football wide receiver
David Dunn (bobsleigh) (born 1936), American bobsledder
David Dunn (Maine politician) (1811–1894), U.S. politician
David Dunn (character), character in the Unbreakable trilogy
David B. Dunn (born 1949), American diplomat
David Dunn (musician) (born 1984), American musician
David Dunn (Montana politician), American politician, member of the Montana House of Representatives

See also
David Dunne (disambiguation)